Fort Missoula Internment Camp was an internment camp operated by the United States Department of Justice during World War II. Japanese Americans and Italian Americans were imprisoned here during this war.

History

Fort Missoula was established near Missoula, Montana as a permanent military post in 1877 in response to citizen concerns of conflict with local Native American tribes. 

In 1941 Fort Missoula was turned over to the "Department of Immigration and Naturalization" for use as an Alien Detention Center for non-military Italian men.

Nearly 1100 Italian citizens were interned at Fort Missoula, including merchant seamen and World's Fair workers who were in the U.S. and could not be returned to Italy, as well as the crew of an Italian luxury liner seized in the Panama Canal. In addition, more than 1,000 Japanese men and 23 German resident aliens were interned before being transferred to other facilities.

The Italians, who referred to Fort Missoula as Camp "Bella Vista" (beautiful view), worked in area farms, fought forest fires and worked in other Missoula industries before being released in 1944

Famed Italian actor Guido Trento (1892–1957), also known as Guy Trent and best known for his 1928 film Street Angel, was held at Fort Missoula and released in 1943 when Italy surrendered to the Allies.  He later immigrated to the United States.

Notes

See also
 Fort Missoula
 Internment of Italian Americans
 Internment of Japanese Americans

External links
  The Historical Museum of Fort Missoula
  Presumed Guilty - Missoulian article
  Missoulian Interview with a former Internee
  "Fort Missoula" - Densho Encyclopedia article
 Fort Missoula Alien Detention Camp Collection  (Montana Memory Project)

World War II internment camps in the United States
Internment camps for Japanese Americans
Buildings and structures in Missoula County, Montana
Missoula
1941 establishments in Montana